Events in the year 1894 in Belgium.

Incumbents
Monarch: Leopold II
Prime Minister: Auguste Marie François Beernaert (until 26 March), Jules de Burlet (starting 26 March)

Events

February – Edouard Whettnall appointed ambassador to London.
25-26 March – Belgian Labour Party adopts the Charter of Quaregnon
5 May – Exposition Internationale d'Anvers opens (to 5 November)
12 May – Publication of an Anglo-Belgian Agreement leasing Bahr el Ghazal to the Congo Free State and a stretch of Congolese territory to the British. The exchange of territory was later rescinded under French and German pressure in the diplomatic build-up to the 1898 Fashoda Incident.
4-11 August – International congress of applied chemistry held in Brussels and Antwerp
14 October – First Belgian general election under universal manhood suffrage.
 28 October – Provincial elections
5 November – Exposition Internationale d'Anvers ends.

Publications
Periodicals
 Revue Néoscholastique begins publication.
 Durendal begins publication.

Other
 Alphonse Dubois, Faune des vertébrés de la Belgique: Série des oiseaux (Brussels, A la librairie C. Muquardt, Th. Falk Sr), vol. 2
 Maurice Maeterlinck, Alladine et Palomides, Interieur, et La mort de Tintagiles: trois petits drames pour marionnettes (Brussels, Edmond Deman)
 Max Rooses, Letterkundige studiën Edmond-Louis de Taeye, Les artistes belges contemporainsArt and architecture

Exhibitions
 17 February-15 March – first exhibition of La Libre Esthétique in Brussels.

Paintings
 Eugène Laermans, The Emigrants Théo van Rysselberghe, Portrait of Irma SèthePhotography
 Édouard Hannon, Matinée d'Automne'' ("Autumn Morning")

Births
1 March — Marguerite Lefèvre, geographer (died 1967)
17 July – Georges Lemaître, physicist and astronomer (died 1966)

Deaths
 22 January – Hendrik Beyaert (born 1823), architect
 4 February – Adolphe Sax (born 1814), inventor of the saxophone
 27 April – Ernest Slingeneyer (born 1820), painter
 18 June – Jean-Baptiste Bethune (born 1821), architect
 15 August – Ernest Baert (born 1860), explorer

References

 
1890s in Belgium